Carmarthenshire and Cardiganshire Constabulary was the Home Office police force for the counties of Carmarthenshire and Cardiganshire, Wales.

It was created on 1 July 1958 by the amalgamation of Carmarthenshire Constabulary and Cardiganshire Constabulary under section 4 of the Police Act 1946. In 1968, the force  amalgamated with Mid-Wales Constabulary and Pembrokeshire Constabulary to form Dyfed-Powys Police.

In 1965, it had an establishment of 355 and an actual strength of 348.

Footnotes

External links
Home Office Circular 74-1958 announcing the force's creation
 Home Office Circular 98-1968 announcing the force's abolition

Defunct police forces of Wales
History of Carmarthenshire
History of Ceredigion
1958 establishments in Wales
Government agencies established in 1958
1968 disestablishments in Wales
Government agencies disestablished in 1968